The Trilogie – Three Journeyes Through the Norwegian Netherworlde, sometimes shortened to The Trilogie, is a box set of albums by Norwegian black metal band Ulver, issued in 1997 via Century Media. Limited to 1000 copies, the set collects together Ulver's first three full-length albums, Bergtatt, Kveldssanger and Nattens madrigal in LP Picture Disc format, housed in a cardboard box, with a booklet & bonus posters. The set commemorates Ulver's black metal phase, before shifting styles dramatically into more ambient, electronic, and experimental music.

Track listing

Bergtatt – Et Eeventyr i 5 Capitler

Kveldssanger

Nattens madrigal – Aatte hymne til ulven i manden

Personnel 

Bergtatt
Garm - vocals, lyrics
Håvard Jørgensen - guitar
Torbjørn Pedersen (Aismal) - guitar
Erik Olivier Lancelot (AiwarikiaR) - drums
 Skoll - bass guitar
Piano – Sverd
Voice, Flute – Lill Kathrine Stensrud 
Kristian Romsøe - Co-producer, Engineer, Mixing
Craig Morris - Mastering
Tanya "Nacht" Stene - album cover design

Kveldssanger
Garm - performer
Håvard Jørgensen - performer
Erik Olivier Lancelot - performer
Alf Gaaskjønli - cello
Artwork – Frk. Maria Jaquete, "Omslaget Er Mahlet Aff"
Composed – Garm, Haavard
Mastering – Craig Morris
Mixed – Kristian Romsøe
Photography – Torgrim Novreit
Technician, Co-producer – Hr. Kristian Romsøe
Cover Design – Tanya "Nacht" Stene

Nattens madrigal
 Garm – vocals
 Håvard Jørgensen – guitar
 Torbjørn Pedersen (Aismal) – guitar
 Erik Olivier Lancelot (AiwarikiaR) – drums
 Skoll – bass guitar
 Arranged By – Ulver
 Composed By – Garm, Haavard*
 Cover – Mrs. Tanya "Nacht" Stene*
 Engineer – Anders G. Offenberg Jr., Andun Johan Strype, Helge Sten*
 Lyrics – Garm, AiwarikiaR
 Photography – Helene Broch, Morten Andersen, Tanya "Nacht" Stene, Torgrim Røvreit
 Translation – Jørn Henrik Sværen, Kai Frost

References 

Ulver albums
1997 compilation albums